is a CD compilation series of Eurobeat music in Japan. The series itself is one of the longest-running music compilations. It has been running for over thirty years and the current list consists of 250 volumes (not counting the many "Super Eurobeat presents" albums).

Originally, Time Records, Flea Records and Discomagic were some of the record labels that appeared on the original Super Eurobeat albums. After eight non-stop albums, the series was changed over to Avex Trax.

The last volume originally was considered: Super Eurobeat Vol.250 but in a recent interview with SEB Adviser and resident DJ, DJ BOSS (Y&Co. Ltd.) he confirmed that Super Eurobeat would definitely be continuing but as a yearly release only, starting with "The Best of Super Eurobeat 2019".

Accolades

See also
Initial D
Dave Rodgers

References

External links
 by Avex Group
Eurobeat Prime
NRGexpress

 
1990 introductions
Avex Group